MoonBabies is the second studio album by instrumental rock/progressive metal supergroup Planet X, released in 2002 through Inside Out Music.

Critical reception

Glenn Astarita at All About Jazz gave MoonBabies a positive review, recommending it highly while praising the band's cohesiveness and each musician's technical craft. François Couture at AllMusic gave the album three stars out of five, remarking that "The music occasionally falls into the culprit of 'complex for complexity's sake'", but also saying it was "more varied and overall accomplished" than Planet X's 2000 debut album Universe. Guitarist Tony MacAlpine, in particular, was described as "a magician, often stealing the show with his inspired solos and soaring lead lines—recalling Allan Holdsworth in his prime."

Track listing

Personnel

Tony MacAlpine – guitar
Derek Sherinian – keyboard
Tom Kennedy – bass (tracks 1, 4–6, 10)
Virgil Donati – drums

Collaborators
Billy Sheehan – bass (track 2)
Jimmy Johnson – bass (tracks 3, 7–9)
Simon Phillips – engineering, mixing, producer
Albert Law – engineering
Brad Vance – mastering

Release history

References

External links
In Review: Planet X "Moon Babies" at Guitar Nine Records

Planet X (band) albums
2002 albums
Inside Out Music albums
Albums produced by Simon Phillips (drummer)